The Warner Scarab is an American seven-cylinder radial aircraft engine, that was manufactured by the Warner Aircraft Corporation of Detroit, Michigan in 1928 through to the early 1940s. In military service the engine was designated R-420.

Variants
Scarab S-50 A 7-cyl. air-cooled radial engine introduced in 1928.

R-420Military designation of the Scarab.
R-500Military designation of the Super Scarab 165.
R-550Military designation of the Super Scarab 185.
145 Alternative designation for the Warner Super Scarab SS-50/50A .
165 Alternative designation for the Warner Super Scarab 165 .
185 Alternative designation for the Warner Super Scarab 185 (Primarily a helicopter application).

Applications

Among the many uses for the Scarab, the engine was fitted to the Cessna Airmaster and the Fairchild 24 (UC-61 or Argus). Notably, in 1942, it was put into use powering the Sikorsky R-4, the first helicopter to be put into production.

Many of these reliable engines soldier on today, still powering the aircraft to which they were originally mounted. The Warner 145 and 165 hp engines are the most commonly seen of the small radials for US-built pre-World War II sad - aircraft, in large part because of good parts availability due to the engines having been used on World War II Fairchild UC-61s and Meyers OTWs.

Warner engines are also in demand as realistically sized, though far more powerful, replacement powerplants for many replica or restored World War I era airplanes which were originally fitted with rotary engines.

Application list

Specifications (Scarab 50)

See also

References

External links

Oldengine.org - US Aero Engine data page 
Transcribed manual

1920s aircraft piston engines
Aircraft air-cooled radial piston engines